Celia Brayfield is an English author, academic and cultural commentator.

Biography

Brayfield was born in the north London suburb of Wembley Park and decided to become a novelist around the age of nine. She was inspired by the headmaster of the local school. She won a place at St Paul's Girls' School in Hammersmith, West London, an academic public school with a literary and political tradition. Her father, a dentist, opposed her literary ambitions and refused to allow her to go to university, although she spent a year as a foreign student in France, at the Universitaire de Grenoble, studying French language and literature.

Between 1988 and 2003 she was a trustee of Gingerbread. From 2013 to 2016 she was a trustee of the Friends of Watlington Library.

She has one daughter and lives in Dorset.

Career
Celia Brayfield is best known as a novelist. After early success with the international bestseller, Pearls, she focused on contemporary social comedies set in millennial London and its suburbs. In 2005, she joined the staff of Brunel University London to set up the creative writing program, becoming a reader in 2006 and an associate reader in 2015. She is also a senior lecturer at Bath Spa University and a member of the Higher Education Committee of the National Association of Writers in Education.

During her first career as a journalist, she specialized in media issues, with columns in the Evening Standard and The Times as well as contributions to many other newspapers and magazines.

Following her childhood role model, Robert Louis Stevenson, Brayfield decided to begin her writing career as a journalist and joined Nova magazine as a trainee sub-editor. She progressed to The Observer as assistant to the women's editor and moved to the Evening Standard. She was hired as a media columnist by Simon Jenkins in 1974. In 1982 she moved to The Times as a television critic, and continues to contribute frequently to the newspaper's op-ed and books pages. The birth of her daughter Chloe in 1980 provided the final spur to Brayfield's ambition to become a novelist. Her Fleet Street experience of celebrity culture led to her first book as sole author of Glitter: The Truth About Fame, a non-fiction study commissioned by the legendary feminist editor Carmen Callil at Chatto & Windus. 
Shortly afterward, Callil commissioned Brayfield's first novel, Pearls, the first of three highly successful and controversial genre best-sellers with strong feminist themes. From the mid-1990s Brayfield progressed to novels of a more literary character, mostly contemporary comedies focused on specific social issues. Her later novels have been acclaimed for the wit, narrative mastery and acute social observation with which they tackle modern themes.   Her novels have been optioned by many film producers including Cruise-Wagner/Paramount

Brayfield developed a growing interesting in how writers learn to write while doing the rounds of promotion tours and literary festivals. Audience questions led to a series of lectures which were the foundation for Bestseller: Secrets of Successful Writing commissioned by Victoria Barnsleyat, the newly launched publisher Fourth Estate.

Brayfield has judged several national literary awards, including the Betty Trask Award, the Macmillan Silver Pen Award and the Authors Club First Novel Prize. She served on the committee of management of The Society of Authors from 1995 to 1998.

She has taught at the Arvon Foundation and Tŷ Newydd and founded W4W, a writers' workshop in West London. Until 2003 she was co-founder and co-director of the National Academy of Writing, which was subsequently linked to the University of Central England.

Publications

Fiction:
Wild Weekend, Time Warner Books, 2004
Mister Fabulous and Friends, Time Warner Books, 2003
Heartswap  Little, Brown, 2000, Time Warner Books 2001
Sunset Little, Brown, 1999, Warner Books 2000.
Getting Home Little, Brown & Warner Books
Harvest Viking 1995, Penguin 1996, Warner Books 1996
White Ice Viking 1993, Penguin 1994,
The Prince Chatto & Windus 1990, Penguin, 1991.
Pearls Chatto & Windus 1987, Penguin 1986, Warner Books 1997

Non-Fiction:
Writing Historical Fiction with Duncan Sprott, Bloomsbury Academic 2014
Arts Reviews Kamera Books, 2008
Deep France Pan Macmillan, 2004.
Bestseller: Secrets of Successful Writing Fourth Estate, 1996
Glitter: The Truth About Fame Chatto & Windus, 1985

Translations, International Publication & Film Rights
Publication rights to Celia's books have been sold in the Czech Republic, France, Germany, Greece, Israel, Italy, the Netherlands, Poland, Russia, Spain, the United States and Zimbabwe. UK editions are sold in Australia, Canada, Eire, New Zealand and South Africa.
Her book Mr. Fabulous & Friends was optioned by Friday Night Films 2004. Heartswap was optioned by Nicole Kidman via Cruise-Wagner Paramount, 2000. Harvest was optioned by Ian McShane for McShane Productions, 1996 and Pearls was optioned by TF1/Flach Film, France, in 1987.

Academic
New Writing international peer-reviewed journal of Creative Writing, Special Edition, Routledge, 2010 Celia co-edited, with Professor Graeme Harper and Dr Andrew Green, a special edition of New Writing, a leading international peer-reviewed journal for Creative Writing, dedicated to staff and students of the Brunel Creative Writing Program. Her own papers included in the edition: Creative Writing: the FAQ and Babelfish Babylon.

Journalism – selected articles include:
Fancy food is enough to turn your stomach The Times, 23 December 2009
The Times Christmas Books: Travel the Times, 28 November 2009
Bombay Sapphires: The Immortals by Amit Chaudhuri The Times, Saturday 14 March 2009
The Last Supper: A Summer in Italy by Rachel Cusk The Times, 30 January 2009
 In Search of a Feeling for Snow: The Times Christmas Books 2008: Travel The Times, 28 November 2008
Horticultural Who's Who: Abderrazak Benchaabane BBC Gardens Illustrated July 2008
It's not hard to say goodbye (to the hardback book) The Times, 21 November 2007
A Faraway Look in their Eyes (travel writing) The Times, 6 December 2007
Rhett Butler's People by Donald McCaig The Times, 2 November 2007
Farewell to Harry (and the bean-counters) The Times, 21 July 2007
Get your kicks on Route 312 The Times, 30 June 2007
It is a truth universally.... oh give it a rest, will you (Austen adaptations) The Times, 12 March 2007
Roll up, roll up and watch the Mona Lisa weep The Times, 19 February 2007
Taking On Goliath: L'Oréal Took My Home by Monica Waitzfelder The New Statesman, 19 February 2007
Required Reading: Shadow of the Silk Road Colin Thubron The Times, 9 September 2006
The Lion, the Witch and the Inklings The Times, 22 November 2005
I’m a Different Person Now: Serious Head Injury (interview), The Times, 9 July 2005.
Far Far Better Things The Times, 2 July 2005
So Your Cat Died (exam marking) The Times, 9 May 2005
The Discerning Woman Isn't Easy to Please (launch of Easy Living magazine) The Times, T2 cover story, 2 March 2005.
Brits tame the wild frontiers: one in three wants to emigrate, but the expats will still write home for marmalade The New Statesman 14 June 2004

References

Who's Who
Debrett's People of Today

External links
www.fantasticfiction.co.uk
journalisted.com
www.meettheauthor.co.uk
www.brunel.ac.uk

English women novelists
1945 births
Living people
People educated at St Paul's Girls' School
Writers from London
Academics of Brunel University London